The white-bellied goshawk (Accipiter haplochrous) is a species of bird of prey in the family Accipitridae. It is endemic to New Caledonia. The species is also known as the New Caledonia goshawk or New Caledonia sparrowhawk.

Its natural habitats are subtropical or tropical moist lowland forest, subtropical or tropical moist montane forest, dry savanna, and heavily degraded former forest. It is threatened by habitat loss.

References

white-bellied goshawk
Endemic birds of New Caledonia
white-bellied goshawk
Taxonomy articles created by Polbot